Samadhan Mahadev Autade is an Indian politician and member of the Maharashtra Legislative Assembly from Pandharpur. Autade is member of the Bharatiya Janata Party. He won 2021 elections by elections for Pandharpur after Bharat Bhalke died of COVID-19 in 2020.

References 

Bharatiya Janata Party politicians from Maharashtra
Living people
People from Solapur district
Maharashtra MLAs 2019–2024
Year of birth missing (living people)